Claude Harry Richmond (born August 3, 1935) is a former BC Liberal Member of the Legislative Assembly in the Canadian province of British Columbia. He represented the riding of Kamloops from 1981 to 1991 and from 2001 to 2009.

He was first elected as MLA for Kamloops in a by-election in 1981 to replace Rafe Mair. Richmond represented the riding for the Social Credit Party of British Columbia, serving in a variety of cabinet portfolios, until leaving politics in 1991. In his first term from 1981 to 1986, Kamloops was a single-member district; in his second term from 1986 to 1991 it was revised to a dual-member district, and Richmond served alongside Bud Smith.

Richmond served as Speaker of the Legislative Assembly of British Columbia from 2001 to 2005, succeeded by Bill Barisoff. He was subsequently appointed the Minister of Employment and Income Assistance.

On May 9, 2008, he announced that he would not stand for re-election in the 2009 provincial election.

References

External links
Legislative Assembly of British Columbia - Claude Richmond

Speakers of the Legislative Assembly of British Columbia
British Columbia Liberal Party MLAs
British Columbia Social Credit Party MLAs
Living people
1935 births
Members of the Executive Council of British Columbia
Tourism ministers of British Columbia
20th-century Canadian politicians
21st-century Canadian politicians